Moch. Bahrudin (born January 1, 1991) is an Indonesian footballer for Deltras FC in the Indonesia Super League. This season he also played for Deltras's reserve team; he played in six games and scored 7 goals.

References

External links

1991 births
Association football forwards
Living people
Indonesian footballers
Liga 1 (Indonesia) players
Deltras F.C. players